Cats and Bruises is a 1965 Warner Bros. Merrie Melodies cartoon directed by Friz Freleng and Hawley Pratt. The short was released on January 30, 1965, and stars Speedy Gonzales and Sylvester.

The cartoon itself is mostly made up of old recycled footage from previous Warner Bros. cartoons.

Plot

Sylvester spies on the Cinco De Mayo festival where Speedy Gonzales and his friends are dancing and partying. Sylvester then dons a mouse disguise consisting of only a pair of mouse ears, and gatecrashes into the festival. At first when two of Speedy's friends mistake Sylvester in the mouse disguise as a giant mouse, Speedy points out to them that it's a cat (el gato), not a mouse, and all the mice then retreat and run for their lives.

Speedy then lures Sylvester to the dog pound, where he gets attacked by numerous bulldogs. Sylvester escapes from the dog pound and continues chasing Speedy. And when Sylvester successfully catches Speedy with a net, Speedy continues running inside the net, dragging Sylvester along until the cat crashes into a pole.

Later, Speedy is serenading his girlfriend on a boat on the lake. And Sylvester sees a already inflated raft and goes after Speedy in the inflatable raft but Speedy throws a dart into the raft, puncturing it and causing Sylvester to sink underwater into the lake.

Next, Sylvester drags a box, a plank and a 500-pound (227-kg) weight to the point at the base of the apartment building that is in a direct vertical line with the window where Speedy and his girlfriend are. He supports the plank with the box in the middle, stands on one end of the plank and heaves the weight onto the other end. This propels him up to Speedy's level and enables him to snatch the mouse. However, as he runs off, the weight lands hard on his head.

Finally, Sylvester builds himself a hot rod racing car and chases Speedy with it. As the chase continues, Sylvester realizes that he forgot to put brakes on the car, and drives off a cliff and into the lake in the middle of the desert.

With Sylvester out of the way, Speedy then tells his friends that the party continues. Speedy's triumph is however short-lived, as an injured Sylvester in a wheelchair then chases Speedy at slow speed, which Speedy claims is "the only way to run."

Notes
Scenes were reused this cartoon:
 The Pied Piper of Guadalupe (The chase scene with a mouse holding a "EL GATO LOCO" sign; and the bubbling and squelching sounds from Sylvester's water-logged go-cart)
 Ain't She Tweet (The dogs nearly tearing Sylvester apart and Sylvester tossing a potted plant onto the dogs, yelling "Ah, shaddap!")
 Here Today, Gone Tamale (one part where Sylvester tries catching Speedy with a net, but was dragged up and down the stairs from the latter's agility, including the cat grabbing a nearby mallet; another scene with Speedy asking Sylvester if he's nervous, with the cat trying to bash the mouse with a piece of lead piping; and the scene with the mice having a celebrative dance with Sylvester joining them)
 A Pizza Tweety Pie (Sylvester in an inflated raft)
 Canary Row (Speedy in place for Tweety)

Crew
 Co-Director: Hawley Pratt 
 Story: John Dunn
 Animation: Bob Matz, Norm McCabe, Don Williams, Manny Perez, Warren Batchelder, Lee Halpern
 Layout: Dick Ung
 Backgrounds: Tom O'Loughlin
 Film Editor: Lee Gunther
 Voice Characterizations: Mel Blanc
 Music: Bill Lava
 Produced by: David H. DePatie and Friz Freleng
 Directed by: Friz Freleng

References

External links
 

1965 animated films
1965 short films
Merrie Melodies short films
Short films directed by Friz Freleng
DePatie–Freleng Enterprises short films
1965 films
Animated films about mice
Animated films about cats
Films set in Mexico
Films scored by William Lava
1960s Warner Bros. animated short films
1960s English-language films
Speedy Gonzales films
Sylvester the Cat films